Eastanollee Creek is a stream in the U.S. state of Georgia.

According to William Bright, "Eastanollee" may be a name derived from the Cherokee language meaning "shoals". Variant names were "Eastanola Creek", "Eastanolee Creek", "Eastanolla Creek", "Eastinaulee Creek", "Estanola Creek", and "Estanolle Creek".

References

Rivers of Georgia (U.S. state)
Rivers of Franklin County, Georgia
Rivers of Stephens County, Georgia